Joshua Kyle Walker (born June 2, 1991) is a former American football guard. He played college football at Middle Tennessee State. Walker was signed by the Indianapolis Colts as an undrafted free agent in 2014. He also played for the Green Bay Packers, Houston Texans, and Jacksonville Jaguars.

Professional career

Indianapolis Colts
After going undrafted in the 2014 NFL Draft, Walker signed with the Indianapolis Colts on May 11, 2014. On August 30, 2014, he was waived. Walker was signed to the Colts' practice squad the following day. On September 16, 2014, he was released from the Colts' practice squad.

Green Bay Packers
On September 23, 2014, Walker was signed to the Green Bay Packers' practice squad, where he spent the rest of his rookie season. He was re-signed by the Packers after the season ended on January 20, 2015.

In his second season, Walker played in 13 games at right guard, right tackle, and on special teams.

On August 30, 2016, he was placed on injured reserve. Walker was released by the Packers on September 3, 2016.

Houston Texans
Walker was signed to the Houston Texans' practice squad on October 27, 2016. He was promoted to the active roster on November 8, 2016.

On September 2, 2017, Walker was waived by the Texans.

Jacksonville Jaguars
On September 8, 2017, Walker signed with the Jacksonville Jaguars.

Walker was named the starting left tackle in Week 6 of the 2018 season after entering the season as the third-string tackle following injuries to Cam Robinson and Josh Wells. He started four games (Weeks 6–10) before suffering foot and ankle injuries in Week 10. He missed the next four games before being placed on injured reserve on December 14, 2018.

References

External links
Jacksonville Jaguars bio
 Green Bay Packers bio
 Indianapolis Colts bio
 

1991 births
Living people
Players of American football from Knoxville, Tennessee
American football offensive guards
American football offensive tackles
Middle Tennessee Blue Raiders football players
Indianapolis Colts players
Green Bay Packers players
Houston Texans players
Jacksonville Jaguars players